The stapedius is the smallest skeletal muscle in the human body. At just over one millimeter in length, its purpose is to stabilize the smallest bone in the body, the stapes or strirrup bone of the middle ear.

Structure
The stapedius emerges from a pinpoint foramen or opening in the apex of the pyramidal eminence (a hollow, cone-shaped prominence in the posterior wall of the tympanic cavity), and inserts into the neck of the stapes.

Nerve supply
The stapedius is supplied by the nerve to stapedius, a branch of the facial nerve.

Function
The stapedius dampens the vibrations of the stapes by pulling on the neck of that bone.   As one of the muscles involved in the acoustic reflex it prevents excess movement of the stapes, helping to control the amplitude of sound waves from the general external environment to the inner ear.

Clinical significance
Paralysis of the stapedius allows wider oscillation of the stapes, resulting in heightened reaction of the auditory ossicles to sound vibration. This condition, known as hyperacusis, causes normal sounds to be perceived as very loud. Paralysis of the stapedius muscle may result when the nerve to the stapedius, a branch of the facial nerve, is damaged, or when the facial nerve itself is damaged before the nerve to stapedius branches. In cases of Bell's palsy, a unilateral paralysis of the facial nerve, the stapedius is paralyzed and hyperacusis may result.

Other animals

Like the stapes bone to which it attaches, the stapedius muscle shares evolutionary history with other vertebrate structures.

The mammalian stapedius evolved from a muscle called the depressor mandibulae in other tetrapods, the function of which was to open the jaws (this function was taken over by the digastric muscle in mammals). The depressor mandibulae arose from the levator operculi in bony fish, and is equivalent to the epihyoidean in sharks.  Like the stapedius, all of these muscles derive from the hyoid arch and are innervated by cranial nerve VII.

See also

 Hearing
 Middle ear
 Ossicles
 Tensor tympanithe other major muscle in the middle ear
 Stapesthe other bone to which the muscle attaches

References

External links

Muscles of the head and neck